Lipyagi is a rural locality (a selo) in Narodnenskoye Rural Settlement, Ternovsky District, Voronezh Oblast, Russia. The population was 721 as of 2010. There are 5 streets.

Geography 
Lipyagi is located 24 km southeast of Ternovka (the district's administrative centre) by road. Narodnoye is the nearest rural locality.

References 

Rural localities in Ternovsky District